Vasiliki Alexandri (born 15 September 1997) is an Austrian synchronized swimmer

Career
Vasiliki was a member of the Greek National Team from 2010. She won gold medals in two Comen Cups on 2010, 2011 (age group 13-15) and she competed at the European Championships (senior category) on 2012 in Eindhoven at the age of 15 years old. Since 2012 she moved to Austria and on 2014 she took the Austrian nationality and represents Austria in synchronised swimming. She represented Austria at the 2017 World Aquatics Championships in Budapest, Hungary and at the 2019 World Aquatics Championships in Gwangju, South Korea. She is a triplet and her sisters Anna-Maria Alexandri and Eirini-Marina Alexandri are also synchronized swimmers.

In 2018, at the 2018 European Aquatics Championships, she finished in 6th place in the solo technical routine.

At the 2019 World Aquatics Championships she finished in 8th place both in the solo technical routine and in the solo free routine.

She competed at the 2022 World Aquatics Championships in Budapest, Hungary.

References 

Living people
1997 births
Austrian people of Greek descent
Austrian synchronized swimmers
Synchronized swimmers at the 2017 World Aquatics Championships
Artistic swimmers at the 2019 World Aquatics Championships
Artistic swimmers at the 2022 World Aquatics Championships
Naturalised citizens of Austria
European Aquatics Championships medalists in synchronised swimming
Greek synchronized swimmers
Triplets
Greek twins
Twin sportspeople
Swimmers from Athens